Nights from the Alhambra is a live album and DVD from the Canadian singer, songwriter, accordionist, harpist, and pianist, Loreena McKennitt and is her first live concert DVD. It was recorded in September 2006, live at the Palace of Charles V, in the Alhambra, Granada, Spain, and released commercially in September 2007.

Track listing 
 Disk 1
 "The Mystic's Dream" (The Mask and Mirror)
 "She Moved Through the Fair" (Elemental)
 "Stolen Child" (Elemental)
 "The Mummers' Dance" (The Book of Secrets) 
 "Penelope's Song" (An Ancient Muse)
 "Marco Polo" (The Book of Secrets)
 "The Bonny Swans" (The Mask and Mirror)
 "Dante's Prayer" (The Book of Secrets)
 "Caravanserai" (An Ancient Muse)

 Disk 2
 "Bonny Portmore" (The Visit)
 "Santiago" (The Mask and Mirror)
 "Raglan Road" (An Ancient Muse - unreleased track)
 "All Souls Night" (The Visit)
 "The Lady of Shalott" (The Visit) 
 "The Old Ways" (The Visit)
 "Never-Ending Road (Amhrán Duit)" (An Ancient Muse)
 "Huron `Beltane` Fire Dance" (Parallel Dreams)
 "Cymbeline" (The Visit)

The DVD track listing is the same except that all the songs are on the same disc. The DVD also includes McKennitt's spoken introductions to songs, which are omitted from the CDs.

Personnel 
Tal Bergman: drums and percussion
Panos Dimitrakopoulos: kanoun
Nigel Eaton: hurdy-gurdy
Steáfán Hannigan: Uilleann pipes, bodhrán, percussion
Brian Hughes: band leader, electric and acoustic guitars, oud, Celtic bouzouki
Caroline Lavelle: cello
Rick Lazar: percussion
Hugh Marsh: violin
Tim Landers: acoustic and electric bass
Loreena McKennitt: vocals, accordion, harp, piano
Donald Quan: viola, keyboards, tabla
Sokratis Sinopoulos: lyra
Haig Yazdjian: oud
Julia Knowles: Director
Mark Cunniffe: Lighting Director
Su Hutchinson: Producer
Mark McCauley: Assistant to Loreena McKennitt

Certifications

References 

Loreena McKennitt albums
2007 live albums
2007 video albums
Live video albums